The 1982 British Speedway Championship was the 22nd edition of the British Speedway Championship. The Final took place on 2 June at Brandon in Coventry, England. The Championship was won by Andy Grahame, who edged out his brother Alan Grahame in second and Kenny Carter in third.

Final 
2 June 1982
 Brandon Stadium, Coventry

See also 
 British Speedway Championship
 1982 Individual Speedway World Championship

References 

British Speedway Championship
Great Britain